Lieutenant General Sir Gerald Graham,  (27 June 1831 – 17 December 1899) was a senior British Army commander in the late 19th century and an English recipient of the Victoria Cross, the highest award for gallantry in the face of the enemy that can be awarded to British and Commonwealth forces.

Early life
He was born in Acton, Middlesex, and after studying at Wimbledon and Dresden he was admitted (1847) to the Royal Military Academy at Woolwich and completed his military training in the School of Military Engineering at Chatham.

Victoria Cross
He was 23 years old, and a lieutenant in the Corps of Royal Engineers, British Army during the Crimean War when the following deed took place for which he was awarded the VC.

On 18 June 1855 in the Crimea, Lieutenant Graham, accompanied by a sapper (John Perie) showed determined gallantry at the head of a ladder party at the assault on the Redan at Sebastopol. He also went out on numerous occasions to bring in wounded officers and men.

Later service

During the Second Anglo-Chinese War he again displayed great courage and skill and, although seriously wounded in the storming of the Taku forts (21 August 1860), subsequently entered Peking with the victors.  Following his return to England in 1861, he was for 16 years commanding engineer successively at Brighton, Aldershot, Montreal, Chatham, Manchester, and York.  In 1877 he was appointed assistant director of works for barracks at the War Office.

In 1882 he accompanied Sir Garnet Wolseley to Egypt as brigadier general, and his forces had a great share in the victorious campaign against Urabi Pasha.  In 1884 he took the field against Osman Digna, whose army he defeated at El-Teb and Tamai.  In the meantime he had urged a plan for the assistance of Gordon, which, however, was not accepted.

Graham led a second Suakin Field Force which arrived at the port on 12 March 1885.  Its purpose was to suppress Osman Digna's forces which were active in the area, and to supervise the construction of the Suakin-Berber Railway. The field force engaged in two actions: at Hashin on 20 March and at Tofrek on 22 March, before the British government changed its policies, shutting down the railway project and leaving the Sudan in May 1885.

In his book "The Battle of Tofrek, fought near Suakin, March 22nd 1885", written shortly after the battle for the purpose of correcting erroneous statements in both official and press reports of the battle, William Galloway was strongly critical of General Graham's planning of the Tofrek expedition on three counts: 
 Compared to the expedition to Hashin on 20 March which Graham commanded himself, which had been protected by four squadrons of British cavalry and a regiment of Bengal cavalry acting as scouts, the Tofrek expedition which he delegated to the command of General McNeill had only one squadron of Lancers plus a company of Mounted Infantry to provide warning of enemy activity;
 Whereas Graham had the protection of a battery of Royal Horse Artillery able to shell the enemy at long range, no artillery was assigned to McNeill's force;
 Whereas the ratio of men to transport animals had been over 5:1 in the earlier expedition, it was no more than 2:1 for the later one, resulting in greater difficulties in keeping controlling of the animals.
Galloway was even more critical of Graham for a last-minute change to McNeill's marching orders.  Instead of following an established track in a southwesterly direction towards Tamai as originally planned, Graham personally instructed McNeill to march westwards into uncharted territory, which turned out to be thickly covered by a jungle of mimosa bushes with long low-lying branches covered in sharp thorns. This caused progress to be both slow and difficult while affording the enemy excellent cover for the surprise attack that they launched later in the day.

Graham was made a Knight Grand Cross of the Order of the Bath in 1896, and a colonel commandant of the Corps of Royal Engineers in 1899. He is buried in East-the Water Cemetery in Bideford in Devon in a grave adjacent to that of George Channer VC.

The medal
His Victoria Cross is currently owned by Graham's Great Great Great Grandson Oliver Brooks and is displayed at the Royal Engineers Museum (Gillingham, England).

Works
He published a number of scientific papers and a contribution to the Fortnightly Review, entitled "Last Words with Gordon" (1887), and prepared a translation of Goetze's Operations of the German Engineers and Technical Troops during the Franco-German War of 1870–71 (1875).

References

Further reading

External links
Royal Engineers Museum Sappers VCs
Location of grave and VC medal (Devonshire)

1831 births
1899 deaths
19th-century English memoirists
Graduates of the Royal Military Academy, Woolwich
Military personnel from London
British Army personnel of the Crimean War
British Army personnel of the Second Opium War
British Army personnel of the Anglo-Egyptian War
British Army personnel of the Mahdist War
Crimean War recipients of the Victoria Cross
Knights Grand Cross of the Order of St Michael and St George
Knights Grand Cross of the Order of the Bath
British Army lieutenant generals
Royal Engineers officers
British Army recipients of the Victoria Cross